"One Way Love" is a song by Swedish singer, Agnetha Fältskog. It was released as a single in 1985, taken from her eighth solo-album Eyes of a Woman. The song was written by Jeff Lynne and produced by Eric Stewart.

The song was the second single to be released from the album and the opening track on the album itself. A video was produced, featuring a 1950s tone, in line with the upbeat and somewhat retro feel of the song.

Jane Esterzhas also recorded a Spanish-language version with vocals by Delana Borges that was mildly well received.

References

1985 singles
Agnetha Fältskog songs
Songs written by Jeff Lynne
Song recordings produced by Eric Stewart
1985 songs
Polar Music singles